A list of chapters of Lambda Sigma Upsilon fraternity.

Undergraduate chapters
Active chapters are indicated in bold. Inactive chapters are indicated in italic.

Alumni chapters

References

External links
 Lambda Sigma Upsilon national website

Lists of chapters of United States student societies by society
Hispanic and Latino organizations